The Abraj Al Bait, also known as the Clock Towers, is a government-owned complex of seven skyscraper hotels in Mecca, Saudi Arabia. These towers are a part of the King Abdulaziz Endowment Project that aims to modernize the city in catering to its pilgrims. The central hotel tower, which is the Makkah Clock Royal Tower, is the fourth-tallest building and sixth-tallest freestanding structure in the world. The clock tower contains the Clock Tower Museum that occupies the top four floors of the tower.

The building complex is 300 metres away from the world's largest mosque and Islam's most sacred site, the Great Mosque of Mecca. The developer and contractor of the complex is the Saudi Binladin Group, the Kingdom's largest construction company. It is the world's second most expensive building, with the total cost of construction totalling US$15 billion. The complex was built after the demolition of the Ajyad Fortress, the 18th-century Ottoman citadel on top of a hill overlooking the Grand Mosque. The destruction of the historically significant site in 2002 by the Saudi government sparked an outcry and a strong reaction from Turkey.

Description
The tallest tower in the complex is the tallest building in Saudi Arabia, at 601 meters (1,972 feet) and a total surface area of 32,000 square meters. It is the sixth-tallest freestanding structure in the world, surpassing the Ping An Finance Centre in Shenzhen, China but shorter than the Burj Khalifa in Dubai, UAE, the Merdeka 118 in Kuala Lumpur, Malaysia, the Tokyo Skytree in Tokyo, Japan, the Shanghai Tower in Shanghai, China, and the Canton Tower in Guangzhou, China.

The site of the complex is across the piazza to the south from the main entrance (King Abdul-Aziz Gate) to the Masjid al Haram mosque, which houses the Kaaba. It accommodates worshippers visiting the Kaaba. The tallest tower in the complex also contains a five-star hotel, operated by Fairmont Hotels and Resorts, to help provide lodging for the millions of pilgrims that travel to Mecca annually to participate in the Hajj.

In addition, The Clock Towers has a five-story shopping mall (The Clock Towers Shopping Center) and a parking garage capable of holding over a thousand vehicles.

The building was planned to be 734 m (2,408 ft) tall in 2006. In 2009, it was published that the final height would be 601 m (1,972 ft). The complex was built by the Saudi Binladin Group, Saudi Arabia's largest construction company. The façade was constructed by Premiere Composite Technologies, and the clock by German tower clock manufacturer PERROT GmbH & Co. KG Turmuhren und Läuteanlagen. According to the Saudi Ministry of Religious Endowments, the project cost US$15 billion.

Clock 
The project uses clock faces for each side of the main hotel tower. The total height of the clock is 57 m (187 ft), just below the media displays under the clock faces. At 43 m × 43 m (141 ft × 141 ft), these are the largest in the world. The roof of the clock is 450 m (1,480 ft) above the ground, making it the world's most elevated architectural clock. A spire has been added on top of the clock giving it a total height of 601 m (1,972 ft). Behind the clock faces, there is an astronomy exhibition. In the spire base and the iron-covered floors (The Jewel) there is a scientific center that is used to sight the moon at the beginning of the Islamic months, and to operate an atomic clock that controls the tower clock faces.

List of component towers

Features

The clock faces are the largest in the world, surpassing the Cevahir Mall clock in Istanbul.

Each of the clock's four faces measures 43 m (141 ft) in diameter and are illuminated by 2 million LED lights, with four oriented edges, just above the clock alongside huge Arabic script reading: "God is [the] greatest" on the north and south faces and on the west and east "There is no god but Allah. Muhammad is the messenger of God.". Four golden domes on pillars on all the corners are also present. The same as the Saudi Flag, fitted at the top of the clock, flash to signal Islam's five-time daily prayers. On special occasions such as new year, 21,000 green and white xenon bulbs and LED lamps during the call to the five prayers times of the day. On special occasions, 40 beacons lights allow innumerable variations of splendid lighting effects. In. addition, the world’s strongest four show lasers throw their rays 30 kilometers into the sky. The clock's four faces are covered with 98 million pieces of glass mosaics. The Saudi coat of arms is displayed at the center of each clock behind the dials. The minute hand is 23 m (75 ft) long, while the hour hand is 18 m (59 ft) long.

There were reports that the clock would be set to local Mecca Time, in an attempt to replace the IERS Reference Meridian as the prime meridian for global time keeping, but the clock is set to Arabia Standard Time (UTC+03:00).

Spire
The spire has an eight-story glass-covered base (The Jewel) which belongs to a scientific center having its own small exhibition, another observation deck at 484 m (1,587.93ft) The highest floor in The Jewel is the Control Tower Floor, which was planned to be used for controlling air traffic in the sky above Mecca (mainly helicopters as airplanes are not allowed near Mecca). However, this was skipped for technical reasons and the future usage is not clear yet. Above from The Jewel the spire has only technical installations for sound, light and other infrastructure and eventually the last viewing deck and the crescent above it. The crescent has two regular floors with living areas and a few service floors and rooms.

The crescent was constructed in Dubai by Premier Composite Technologies in April 2011. The crescent is made of fiberglass-backed mosaic gold, and it weighs up to 35 tones. Peugeot Joseph, the company official, said a team of five engineers and a hundred workers carried out the project, which cost 90 million United Arab Emirates dirhams and took three months to build.

The company has also constructed the Mecca Clock. The crescent was divided into 10 parts to move it to Mecca. The crescent was partly assembled on the base of the clock face to reduce it to 5 parts. Those five parts were then lifted and installed above the spire from 20 June to 6 July 2011.

The minaret and its base have loudspeakers which broadcast prayer calls to a distance of 7 km away and across an area of approximately 160 km².

Incidents

Construction fires
The Clock Towers complex had two fire incidents during construction. The first fire accident was at Hajar Tower on 28 October 2008. It took 400 firefighters to put out the fire, which burned for 10 hours, consuming nine floors of the tower. According to eyewitness reports, the blaze erupted shortly after midnight, and spread rapidly because of wood used for construction stored in the premises. Soon, the entire building was engulfed in smoke. Hospitals were put on high alert, but no injuries were reported. A civil defence spokesman said the fire started on the 32nd floor of the Hajar Tower.

The second fire struck the Safa Tower on 1 May 2009. No deaths or injuries were reported in the blaze which was quickly contained by Civil Defence. Eyewitnesses said the fire broke out soon after Asr prayer while some workers in the building were welding iron rods on wooden scaffoldings. The fire damaged a large part of the under-construction tower. According to Major General Adel Zamzami, director general of Civil Defence in the Mecca province, the fire broke out at the 14th floor and reached up to the 20th floor.

Controversy

The construction engendered some controversy as the location chosen for the towers was the historic 18th-century Ottoman Ajyad Fortress, which many locals consider to be a symbol of Ottoman oppression. The fortress was demolished to make way for the complex. The development has been criticised by The Guardian for having "transformed a type of architecture that evolved from a dense urban grain of low-rise courtyards and narrow streets into ... an endlessly repeatable pattern for the decoration of standardised [concrete] slab(s)".

Gallery

See also

 List of buildings with 100 floors or more
 List of tallest buildings in Saudi Arabia
List of tallest buildings
List of largest buildings
List of tallest hotels
 List of largest clock faces

References

External links 

 
 
 Reshaping Mecca—slide show, The New York Times
 

2012 establishments in Saudi Arabia
Buildings and structures in Mecca
Clock towers
Hotel buildings completed in 2012
Hotels established in 2012
Skyscrapers in Mecca
Arabic architecture
Shopping malls in Saudi Arabia
Residential skyscrapers in Saudi Arabia
Skyscraper hotels in Saudi Arabia
Landmarks in Saudi Arabia
Fairmont Hotels and Resorts